Stem cell chip is a device that detects given biochemical changes in stem cells, for example changes in RNA expression.

References

See also
 Stem cell genomics

Stem cells